Mundhanai Mudichu is a 2010 Indian Tamil-language soap opera that aired on Sun TV. The show premiered from 26 April 2010 to 4 April 2015 for 1,325 episodes. It aired Monday through Saturday at 6:00PM IST. The show stars Delhi Kumar, Shree Durga, Manoharan Krishnan, Rani and Hemalatha

The show produced by Cine Times Entertainment and Directed by  Salem Siva MP, P.Selvam, Sundar.K.Vijayan,Saadhasivam Perumal. and Creative Head by Siddhiq.

The "Mundhanai Mudichu" theme song was written by lyricist Vairamuthu and composed by Kumar and Pandiyan. Other music for the serial is provided by G. V. Kalaikathir. It also airs in Sri Lanka on the Tamil channel Vasantham TV.

Plot
The Story is about Kandaswamy and his family. Prema wants to destroy Kandaswamy and his family because she thinks that her father was killed by Kandaswamy. So, she makes lot of evil plans and gives troubles to Kandaswamy's family but Kavitha, eldest daughter-in-law of the family, stands against her and saves the family from Prema.

Cast

Main
 Delhi Kumar as Kanthasamy (Episode 1-1325)
 Manoharan as Muthukumar (1-1325)
 Sri Vidya (1-404) → Shree Durga (405-1325) as Kavitha Muthukumar
 Vineetha Shalini (1-1099) → Soniya as Meena Madhavan (Madhavan's 1st wife) (1100-1325)
 Maanas Chavali as Madhavan (558-1325)
 Ramya Shankar (1-56) → Krithika Annamalai (56-575) → Pooja Lokesh (575-989) → Rani (989-1325) as Prema Pazhaniyappan

Recurring
 Sreeja Chandran as Tamizharasi
 Prakash Rajan as Saravanan
 Srisha as Vasanthi Saravanan
 Kurunji Nathan as Karthik
 Durga as Swathi Karthik
 Pooja → Jyothi as Thenmozhi
 Thilla as Pazhaniyappan (Kanthasamy Brother, Prema's husband)
 Vetrivelan as Ranjith Raj
 Hari Priya as Anitha Ranjith Raj
 Sridhar as Rathnam Madhavan's father
 Vijayalakshmi as Nandhini 
 Geetha Saraswathi as Uma Madhavan's mother
 Srividya Natrajan as Avanthika Madhavan (Madhavan's 2nd Wife)
 Bhavani → Rekha Suresh as Avanthika's mother
 Madhu Mohan as Avanthika's father
 Raghuvaran as Karuppu
 Sri Vidhya Shankar as Tamizharasi's biological mother
 Sivan Srinivasan as Tamilzharasi's biological father
 Sruthi as Priya (Tamizharasi's friend, died in serial, killed by Ashok)
 Vijayalakshmi → J. Lalitha as Ashok's mother
 Vijay Anand (1-500) → Sharvan Rajesh (500-715) → Nesan (716-1325) as Ashok (Priya's affair, jailed)
 Kovai Krishnan as Thangarasu (Ashok's father, died in serial)
 Sangeetha as Sailatha
 S. N. Parvathi as Meenakshi, Sadhasivam's mother
 Kuyili as Meenakshi (Kavitha's, Vasanthi's and Swathi's mother, died in the serial, killed by Prema)
 Raviprakash → Mohan Sharma as Annamalai (Kavitha's, Vasanthi's and Swathi's father, Died in the serial, killed by Sadhasivam)
 Sulakshana as Krishnaveni Kanthasamy (Died in the serial, killed by Prema)
 S. N. Lakshmi → Vatsala Rajagopal as Kanthasamy and Pazhaniyappan's  Mother (Died in the serial, killed by Prema)
 Pollachi Babu as Sadhasivam (jailed)
 Bhuvana → Revathy Sankar as Prema's mother (died in the serial)
 Rajkumar Manoharan as Meena's ex-lover (dead in serial, killed by Madhavan) 
 Hemalatha as Vedhavalli (Pazhaniyappan First Wife, Killed By Pazhaniyappan)

See also
 List of programs broadcast by Sun TV

References

External links
 Official Website 
 Sun TV on YouTube
 Sun TV Network 
 Sun Group 

Sun TV original programming
2010 Tamil-language television series debuts
Tamil-language television shows
2015 Tamil-language television series endings